The following is the list of Ambassadors to Belgium. Note that some diplomats are accredited by, or to, more than one country.

Current Ambassadors to Brussels

See also
List of ambassadors from Belgium

References

(French) 

Ambassadors|Ambassador
 
Belgium